The Adventures of Paddington (French: Les aventures de Paddington) is an animated television series developed for television by Jon Foster and James Lamont. The series is co-produced by StudioCanal and Heyday Films, with the participation of Nickelodeon, M6 and Piwi+. The animation for the series is produced by Blue-Zoo and Superprod Animation. The series is based on the Paddington Bear franchise. The series airs on Nickelodeon internationally, except in France where the series airs on Gulli and later on M6 and Piwi+.

Series overview

Episodes

Season 1 (2019–20)

Season 2 (2021–22)

References 

Lists of British children's television series episodes
Lists of French television series episodes
Lists of Nickelodeon television series episodes
Paddington Bear